Atrocities is the fourth studio album by American rock band Christian Death, released in 1986 through record label Normal.

The album's subject matter deals almost exclusively with the Holocaust, including songs about Auschwitz and Josef Mengele. Recorded at Rockfield Studios in Monmouth, Wales it also featured the songwriting and arrangement skills of Barry Galvin, who, along with Johann Schumann, would leave the group upon the completion of Atrocities - both went on to form Mephisto Walz.

It is the first Christian Death record with Valor Kand taking over main duties following Rozz Williams' departure.

Track listing
Prologue
"Will-o-the-Wisp" (Valor) - 3:15
"Tales of Innocence" (Valor, B. Galvin) - 6:23
"Strapping Me Down" (Valor, B. Galvin) - 2:36
"The Danzig Waltz" (Valor) - 3:31
"Chimere De-ci De-la" (Valor) - 4:41

Finale
"Silent Thunder" (Valor, B. Galvin) - 6:32
"Strange Fortune" (Valor) - 3:52
"Ventriloquist" (Valor) - 4:31
"Gloomy Sunday" (Sam M. Lewis, Rezső Seress) - 3:01
"The Death of Josef" (Valor, D. Glass) - 4:41

Personnel
Valor Kand - vocals, guitar, violin, piano
Gitane Demone - vocals, keyboards
Johann Schumann - bass
Barry Galvin - guitar, vocals
David Glass - drums

References

Christian Death albums
1986 albums
Candlelight Records albums
Cleopatra Records albums
Normal Records albums
Albums recorded at Rockfield Studios
Songs about the Holocaust